Mwananchi Communications Ltd is a company based in Tanzania. Mwananchi Communications Ltd, engages in the print media and digital media, and is the publisher of Tanzania's leading daily newspaper, Mwananchi (in Swahili), and others such as The Citizen, Sunday Citizen, Mwananchi Jumapili, Mwananchi Scoop and Mwanaspoti.

The executive editor is Victor Mushi and the Mwananchi daily managing editor is Joseph Nyabukika. Michael Momburi heads Mwanaspoti in Tanzania and Kenya. Sanga, a former Managing Editor is regarded as the sports journalism guru in the region. His influence in sports led Kenyan media to start sports newspapers, such as Sports On and Game Yetu. Mpoki Thomson is the Managing Editor of The Citizen Daily and Sunday Citizen, which have contributed much to socio-economic changes in Tanzania and in the region as well. Upon his appointment to the Managing Editor role in January 2021, he became the youngest editor to hold such a position at 28 years old. 

Bakari Machumu, who once served as the Executive Editor is now the Managing Director of the company. 

Mwananchi  Communications Limited was established in May 1999 by Ambassador Ferdinand Ruhinda as Media Communications Ltd. But in April 2001, a new business was established (Advertising Agency & Public Relations) and a new company was formed—Mwananchi Communications Ltd. In the very same year Mwananchi Communications Ltd was acquired by the Nation Media Group (NMG), which is based in Nairobi, Kenya.

Location

It is headquartered at Plot No. 34/35 Tabata Relini on Mandela Road, Dar es Salaam, Tanzania. It is part of the Nation Media Group, a publicly listed company, quoted on the Nairobi Stock Exchange, and has about 7,500 shareholders. Its principal shareholder is the Aga Khan Fund for Economic Development, an agency of the Aga Khan Development Network.

History 
The history of Mwananchi Communications Ltd. can be traced back to 1999 when Hon. Ferdinand Ruhinda started a communications company known as Media Communications Ltd, which saw an important need to introduce a daily Swahili paper Mwananchi registered on April 20, 2000. On May 27, 2000, the first copy of Mwananchi was launched. It was a 12-page newspaper retailing at Sh150. The market at the time was not as fragmented as it is now, as there were only three mainstream daily Swahili newspapers in the market as opposed to the eight mainstream daily Swahili papers today. This paper has since had continuous improvement for format and presentation that has seen its leadership position in the market sustained.

Shortly after the launch of Mwananchi, a biweekly sports newspaper Mwanaspoti was launched on February 12, 2001, respectively. It was a 12-page sports paper retailing at only Sh100. This paper has also gone through tremendous improvement for content and format to ensure that the ever changing needs of its readers are met.

After two and half years of successful operations of the two products, in April 2001, the role of publishing was handed over from Media Communications to a newly registered publishing company, Mwananchi Communications Ltd. In December 2002, Nation Media Group of Kenya purchased controlling interests in the company and this has since helped to ingrain the company with world class values in editorial management including standardizing the group's editorial policies.

Having registered The Citizen with Tanzania Information Services (Maelezo) on March 2, 2001, the paper was only fully launched and published on September 16, 2004, to become the fifth English daily newspaper in the market.

The Company's publications were printed by contract until 2005, when it acquired a secondhand printing press from Australia.

In 2020 it was ordered by the Tanzania Communications Regulatory Authority to suspend the online publication of Mwananchi for six months and pay a fine of 5 million shilling for publishing "misleading information that caused confusion in the community". Two of its employees were arrested and charged accused of breaching the cybercrimes act of 2015.

Newspapers

English language newspapers
The Citizen – An independent English newspaper in Tanzania
The Citizen on Sunday – The Sunday edition of The Citizen
Swahili-language newspapers
Mwananchi – Leading daily newspaper in Tanzania
Mwanaspoti – A biweekly sports and entertainment newspaper
Mwanaspoti Kenya - Kenya’s first and leading Kiswahili sports newspaper
Mwananchi Jumapili – The Sunday edition of Mwananchi newspaper
Mwananchi Scoop - Swanglish digital magazine for youth  that covers stories on entertainment and sports, stories, gossip, career and skills, technology, health, fashion and money management

Magazines

English language magazines
Your Health – a health magazine published every Monday and carried in The Citizen
Political Platform – a political review magazine published every Wednesday and carried in The Citizen
Success – an education review magazine published every Monday and carried in The Citizen
The Beat – a magazine focusing on entertainment and showbiz issues published every Friday and carried in The Citizen
Business Week – a business magazine published every Thursday and carried in The Citizen
Woman – a woman's magazine published every Saturday and carried in The Citizen
 Sound Living - A family magazine that features uplifting stories that happen in society

Swahili-language magazines
SpotiMikiki – a sports magazine published every Monday and carried in Mwananchi
Siasa – focuses on analysis of the recent political events and investigative stories; a pullout published every Tuesday and carried in Mwananchi
Maarifa – a platform for sharing among students and teachers. It is a pullout published every Wednesday and carried in Mwananchi
Uchumi – a magazine that focuses on business news, events, and economic matters, it is published every Thursday and carried in Mwananchi
Jungukuu – a society issues magazine published every Friday and carried in Mwananchi
Starehe – a sports magazine published every Saturday and carried in Mwananchi
Johari – a special pull-out magazine targeted at the female reader, with articles on fashion, decor, beauty, short stories, parenting advice etc., published every Sunday and carried in Mwananchi Jumapili

References

External links
thecitizen.co.tz – official website for The Citizen
mwananchi.co.tz – official website for The Mwananchi
mwanaspoti.co.tz – official website for Mwanaspoti
mwananchiscoop - official website for Mwananhi Scoop
mcl.co.tz – official website for Mwananchi Communications Ltd

Mass media in Tanzania
Companies of Tanzania
Nation Media Group
Companies established in 1999
1999 establishments in Tanzania
Mass media in Dar es Salaam
Newspapers published in Tanzania